The Very Best of Elvis Costello is a compilation album on two compact discs by Elvis Costello, sampling his recorded work from the years 1977 through 1998. First issued on Polygram Records on 21 September 1999, it was re-released less than two years later on Rhino Records as the first entry in their comprehensive Costello reissue series. A one-disc version was also released.

Track listing
All songs written by Elvis Costello unless otherwise indicated.

Disc one
"(What's So Funny 'Bout) Peace, Love, and Understanding" (Nick Lowe) (single, 1978) – 3:31
"Oliver's Army" (from Armed Forces, 1979) – 2:57
"Watching the Detectives" (single, 1977) – 3:43
"Alison" (from My Aim Is True, 1977) – 3:21
"(I Don't Want to Go to) Chelsea" (from This Year's Model, 1978) – 3:07
"Accidents Will Happen" (from Armed Forces, 1979) – 3:01
"Pump It Up" (from This Year's Model, 1978) – 3:13
"I Can't Stand Up for Falling Down" (Homer Banks, Alan Jones) (from Get Happy!!, 1980) – 2:05
"Radio Radio" (single, 1978) – 3:06
"Clubland" (from Trust, 1981) – 3:43
"A Good Year for the Roses" (Jerry Chesnut) (from Almost Blue, 1981) – 3:35
"Man Out of Time" (from Imperial Bedroom, 1982) – 5:25
"I Wanna Be Loved" (Farnell Jenkins) (from Goodbye Cruel World, 1984) – 4:46
"Everyday I Write the Book" (from Punch the Clock, 1983) – 3:52
"Brilliant Mistake" (from King of America, 1986) – 3:41
"The Other Side of Summer" (from Mighty Like a Rose, 1991) – 3:53
"Tokyo Storm Warning" (from Blood and Chocolate, 1986) – 6:23
"Sulky Girl" (from Brutal Youth), 1994) – 5:04
"So Like Candy" (MacManus, McCartney) (from Mighty Like a Rose, 1991) – 4:35
"Veronica" (MacManus, McCartney) (from Spike, 1989) – 3:07
"She" (Charles Aznavour, Herbert Kretzmer) (from Soundtrack to Notting Hill, 1999) – 3:05

Disc two

 "Big Tears" (B-side of "Pump It Up" single, 1978) – 3:10
 "Beyond Belief" (from Imperial Bedroom, 1982) – 2:33
 "Lipstick Vogue" (from This Year's Model, 1978) – 3:31
 "Green Shirt" (from Armed Forces, 1979) – 2:44
 "Pills and Soap" (from Punch the Clock, 1983) – 3:43
 "Tramp the Dirt Down" (from Spike), 1989) – 5:41
 "Shipbuilding" (MacManus, Clive Langer) (from Punch the Clock, 1983) – 4:51
 "High Fidelity" (from Get Happy!!, 1980) – 2:28
 "New Lace Sleeves" (from Trust, 1981) – 3:47
 "(The Angels Wanna Wear My) Red Shoes" (from My Aim Is True, 1977) – 2:46
 "Talking in the Dark" (single, 1979) – 1:57
 "New Amsterdam" (from Get Happy!!, 1980) – 2:13
 "I Hope You're Happy Now" (from Blood and Chocolate, 1986) – 3:07
 "Riot Act" (from Get Happy!!, 1980) – 3:34
 "My Funny Valentine" (Lorenz Hart, Richard Rodgers) (B-side from "Oliver's Army" single, 1979) – 1:29
 "Indoor Fireworks" (from King of America, 1986) – 4:09
 "Almost Blue" (from Imperial Bedroom, 1982) – 2:49
 "I Want You" (from Blood and Chocolate, 1986) – 6:43
 "God Give Me Strength" (Burt Bacharach, MacManus) (from Painted from Memory, 1998) – 6:10
 "That Day Is Done" (MacManus, McCartney) (I Couldn't Hear Nobody Pray, 1997) – 5:10
 "I Want to Vanish" (from All This Useless Beauty, 1996) – 3:14

Charts

Weekly charts

Year-end charts

References

2001 greatest hits albums
Albums produced by Burt Bacharach
Albums produced by Elvis Costello
Albums produced by Nick Lowe
Albums produced by T Bone Burnett
Elvis Costello compilation albums